The 1906 Illinois Fighting Illini football team was an American football team that represented the University of Illinois during the 1906 college football season.  In their second non-consecutive season under head coach Justa Lindgren, the Illini compiled a 1–3–1 record and finished in fifth place in the Western Conference. Halfback Ira T. Carrithers was the team captain.

Schedule

References

Illinois
Illinois Fighting Illini football seasons
Illinois Fighting Illini football